Vekur is a village in Tapi district of Gujarat state of India.

References

Villages in Tapi district